Tulim is a recently developed beef cattle breed, a composite of Tuli and Limousin cattle. Their origin and major distribution is in South Africa.

External links
 Cattle Breeds

Cattle breeds originating in South Africa
Cattle breeds